Shaun Wyvill is a former professional rugby league footballer who played in the 1990s. He played at representative level for Ireland, and at club level for Skirlaugh of Hull.

International honours
Shaun Wyvill won a cap for Ireland while at Skirlaugh 1996 1-cap (sub).

References

Ireland national rugby league team players
Living people
Place of birth missing (living people)
Year of birth missing (living people)